Sayyid Ali-Akbar Mousavi Hosseini was an Iranian Shia cleric, conservative politician and television personality.

A member of parliament representing Tehran, Rey, Shemiranat and Eslamshahr from 1992 to 2000, he was head of the parliamentary group Hezbollah fraction which maintained close ties to the Combatant Clergy Association.

Hosseini was a host of an important TV show named Akhlagh dar Khanevadeh, broadcast by the Islamic Republic of Iran Broadcasting. According to Kim Murphy, Hosseini was a "popular television cleric" and "a mild-mannered mullah who draws millions of viewers for his Saturday night program on Islam and the family". Fariba Adelkhah identifies him with the clerical title of Hojatoleslam and described him as "well known for his sarcastic and humorous televised comments".

References 

 Official profile at Iranian Parliament

1939 births
2018 deaths
Combatant Clergy Association politicians
Members of the 5th Islamic Consultative Assembly
Members of the 4th Islamic Consultative Assembly
Iranian Shia clerics
Iranian television personalities